Greed in the Sun is a 1964 French-Italian adventure film directed by Henri Verneuil. The film was entered into the 1964 Cannes Film Festival.

Plot
The forwarder Castigliano instructs Steiner to drive a new truck with a payload through the Sahara Desert. Steiner is new to the operation and is viewed with suspicion by the other employees. In the evening Steiner goes out with Rocco, Marec and some colleagues. The next morning the truck is gone. Castigliano is furious and orders Marec to retrieve the truck which was stolen by Rocco. Rocco with his girlfriend Pepa head towards the border. A wild chase begins through the deserts and impassable areas.

Marec travels with Steiner. When crossing a state it turns out that Steiner is actually called Frocht; he was the leader of a band of mercenaries in a coup d'état. Rocco succeeds in shaking off Marec several times. Mitch has to repeatedly come to the aide of Marec. After Rocco’s truck breaks down, he sets a trap for Marec and Steiner. Rocco forces Marec at gunpoint to exchange his roadworthy truck with the defective truck. Steiner tries to fight back and receives a gunshot through his leg. Rocco leaves Marec and Steiner stranded in the desert. Rocco tries to sell the cargo for $100,000 to a fence.

Marec and Steiner finally make it to the next town, where Marec abandons Steiner after expressing his disgust for the man and happens across Rocco in a brothel. A wild brawl erupts between the two, and when they are both too weak to beat each other up further, Rocco admits that he showed up to the rendezvous with the fence but the fence was not there. When he came back to the hotel, he discovered that Pepa had made off with the truck and the payload.

Cast
 Jean-Paul Belmondo as Rocco
 Lino Ventura as Hervé Marec
  as John Steiner (alias Peter Frocht)
 Bernard Blier as Mitch-Mitch
 Andréa Parisy as Pepa
 Gert Fröbe as Castigliano
  as Angèle
  as Khenouche
  as Halibi
 Henri Lambert as Robert, a guest at "Chez Zeze"
 Pierre Collet as one of Castigliano's workers
 
 Paul Bonifas

Production
Director Henry Verneuil said the film was "a Western, but since in France we don't have horses, I use trucks. I give Jean Paul the hat, blue jeans, boots of a cowboy. He's one of the few young actors in France who is young and manly."

Reception

Box office
The film was a box office hit in France. It was the seventh most popular film of the year at the French box office.

Critical
New York Times film critic Howard Thompson gave mixed review of the film, stating that "Some interesting ingredients hover in mid-air throughout this overlong film, which lacks real cohesion or impact".

Awards
The film was nominated for the Palme d'Or at the 1964 Cannes Film Festival.

References

External links

Greed in the Sun at Le Film Guide

1960s adventure comedy films
1964 films
French black-and-white films
CinemaScope films
1960s chase films
Films scored by Georges Delerue
Films directed by Henri Verneuil
Films set in deserts
Films set in Morocco
French adventure films
1960s French-language films
Italian adventure films
Films with screenplays by Michel Audiard
Trucker films
Films shot in Almería
1964 comedy films
1960s Italian films
1960s French films